Yvan Quentin (born 2 May 1970 in Collombey-Muraz) is a retired Swiss football defender.

He was capped 41 times for the Swiss national team between 1992 and 2002. He played four games at the 1994 FIFA World Cup, and was in the Euro 1996 squad.

He is the "nephew" of former Swiss international René-Pierre.

Honours

Player
FC Sion
Swiss Championship: 1991–92, 1996–97
Swiss Cup: 1994–95, 1995–96, 1996–97

FC Zürich
Swiss Cup: 1999–2000

References

External links
 

1970 births
Living people
Swiss men's footballers
1994 FIFA World Cup players
UEFA Euro 1996 players
FC Zürich players
Neuchâtel Xamax FCS players
FC Sion players
Swiss Super League players
Switzerland international footballers
Swiss-French people
Association football defenders